Hoi polloi is an expression from Greek that means "the many" or, in the strictest sense, "the people". In English, it has been given a negative connotation to signify the masses. Synonyms for hoi polloi include "the plebs" (plebeians), "the rabble", "the masses", "the great unwashed", "riffraff", and "the proles" (proletarians).

The phrase probably became known to English scholars through Pericles' Funeral Oration, as mentioned in Thucydides' History of the Peloponnesian War. Pericles uses it in a positive way when praising the Athenian democracy, contrasting it with hoi oligoi, "the few" (see also oligarchy).

Its current English usage originated in the early 19th century, a time when it was generally accepted that one must be familiar with Greek and Latin in order to be considered well educated. The phrase was originally written in Greek letters. Knowledge of these languages served to set apart the speaker from hoi polloi in question, who were not similarly educated.

Pronunciation
Pronunciation depends on the speaker:
 English speakers pronounce it .
 Ancient Greek had phonemic consonant length, or gemination. Speakers would have pronounced it  with the double-λ being  geminated. 
 Modern Greek speakers pronounce it  since in Modern Greek there is no voiceless glottal /h/ phoneme and οι is pronounced  (all Ancient Greek diphthongs are now pronounced as monophthongs). Greek Cypriots still pronounce the double-λ.

Usage
Some linguists argue that, given that hoi is a definite article, the phrase "the hoi polloi" is redundant, akin to saying "the the masses". Others argue that this is inconsistent with other English loanwords. The word "alcohol", for instance, derives from the Arabic al-kuhl, al being an article, yet "the alcohol" is universally accepted as good grammar.

Appearances in the nineteenth century

There have been numerous uses of the term in English literature. James Fenimore Cooper, author of The Last of the Mohicans, is often credited with making the first recorded usage of the term in English. The first recorded use by Cooper occurs in his 1837 work Gleanings in Europe where he writes "After which the oi polloi are enrolled as they can find interest."

Lord Byron had, in fact, previously used the term in his letters and journal. In one journal entry, dated 24 November 1813, Byron writes:

Byron also wrote an 1821 entry in his journal "... one or two others, with myself, put on masks, and went on the stage with the 'oi polloi."

In Confessions of an English Opium-Eater, Thomas De Quincey uses the term during a passage discussing which of the English classes is most proud, noting "... the children of bishops carry about with them an austere and repulsive air, indicative of claims not generally acknowledged, a sort of noli me tangere manner, nervously apprehensive of too familiar approach, and shrinking with the sensitiveness of a gouty man from all contact with the οι πολλοι."
 
While Charles Darwin was at the University of Cambridge from 1828 to 1831, undergraduates used the term "hoi polloi" or "Poll" for those reading for an ordinary degree, the "pass degree". At that time only capable mathematicians would take the Tripos or honours degree. In his autobiography written in the 1870s, Darwin recalled that "By answering well the examination questions in Paley, by doing Euclid well, and by not failing miserably in Classics, I gained a good place among the οἱ πολλοί, or crowd of men who do not go in for honours."

W. S. Gilbert used the term in 1882 when he wrote the libretto of the comic opera Iolanthe. In Act I, the following exchange occurs between a group of disgruntled fairies who are arranging to elevate a lowly shepherd to the peerage, and members of the House of Lords who will not hear of such a thing:

Gilbert's parallel use of canaille, plebs (plebeians), and hoi polloi makes it clear that the term is derogatory of the lower classes. In many versions of the vocal score, it is written as "οἱ πολλοί", likely confusing generations of amateur choristers who had not had the advantages of a British Public School education.

John Dryden used the phrase in his Essay of Dramatick Poesie, published in 1668. Dryden spells the phrase with Greek letters, but the rest of the sentence is in English (and he does precede it with "the").

Appearances in the twentieth century
The term has appeared in several films and radio programs. For example, one of the earliest short films from the Three Stooges, Hoi Polloi (1935), opens in an exclusive restaurant where two wealthy gentlemen are arguing whether heredity or environment is more important in shaping character. They make a bet and pick on nearby trashmen (the Stooges) to prove their theory. At the conclusion of three months in training, the Stooges attend a dinner party, where they thoroughly embarrass the professors.

The University of Dayton's Don Morlan says, "The theme in these shorts of the Stooges against the rich is bringing the rich down to their level and shaking their heads." A typical Stooges joke from the film is when someone addresses them as "gentlemen", and they look over their shoulders to see who is being addressed. The Three Stooges turn the tables on their hosts by calling them "hoi polloi" at the end.

At the English public school (i.e., private school) Haileybury and Imperial Service College, in the 1950s and '60s, grammar schoolboys from nearby Hertford were referred to as "oips", from "hoi polloi", to distinguish them from comprehensive and secondary modern schoolboys, the lowest of the low, who were called "oiks".

Carole King's TV special Really Rosie (based on Maurice Sendak's works) contains a song called "My Simple Humble Neighborhood", in which Rosie remembers those whom she's met over the years.  In the process, she mentions the hoi polloi as well as the grand elite.

The term continues to be used in contemporary writing. In his 1983 introduction to Robert Anton Wilson's Prometheus Rising, Israel Regardie writes, "Once I was even so presumptuous as to warn (Wilson) in a letter that his humor was much too good to waste on hoi polloi who generally speaking would not understand it and might even resent it."

The term "hoi polloi" was used in a dramatic scene in the film Dead Poets Society (1989). In this scene, Professor Keating speaks negatively about the use of the article "the" in front of the phrase:

Keating's tone makes clear that he considers this statement to be an insult. He used the phrase "the hoi polloi", to demonstrate the mistake he warned against.

The term was also used in the comedy film Caddyshack (1980). In a rare moment of cleverness, Spaulding Smails greets Danny Noonan as he arrives for the christening of The Flying Wasp, the boat belonging to Judge Elihu Smails (Spaulding's grandfather), with "Ahoy, polloi! Where did you come from, a scotch ad?" This is particularly ironic, because Danny has just finished mowing the Judge's lawn, and arrives overdressed, wearing a sailboat captain's outfit (as the girl seated next to him points out, Danny "looks like Dick Cavett").

Todd Rundgren's band Utopia recorded a song titled "Hoi Polloi" on their album Deface the Music (1980), in which all of the songs are written and performed in the style of the Beatles.

The Lovin' Spoonful's song "Jug Band Music" includes the line: "He tried to mooch a towel from the hoi polloi."

In the song "Risingson" on Massive Attack's Mezzanine album, the singer apparently appeals to his company to leave the club they're in, deriding the common persons' infatuation with them, and implying that he's about to slide into antisocial behaviour:

In an episode of This American Life, radio host Ira Glass uses the term hoi polloi while relaying a story about a woman who believes the letter 'q' should occur later in the alphabet. He goes on to say that "Q does not belong in the middle of the alphabet where it is, with the hoi polloi of the alphabet, with your 'm' 'n' and 'p'. Letters that will just join any word for the asking."

The term was used in a first-series episode (The New Vicar, aired 5 November 1990) of the British sitcom Keeping Up Appearances. The main character, Hyacinth Bucket, gets into a telephone argument with a bakery employee. When the employee abruptly hangs up in frustration, Hyacinth disparagingly refers to him as "hoi polloi". This is in keeping with her character; she looks down upon those she considers to be of lesser social standing, including working-class people.

Hoi Polloi was used in Larry Marder's Tales of the Beanworld to name the unusual group of creatures that lived beneath the Beanworld.

In the first scene of The PlayStation ad "Double Life," a British man says, "In the day, I do my job, I ride the bus, Roll up my sleeves with the Hoi polloi".

Sue Townsend's Adrian Mole writes a poem called "The Hoi Polloi Reception" and later works as a cook "offal chef" in a Soho restaurant called Hoi Polloi.

The Scottish punk rock band Oi Polloi got their name as a pun of the Greek phrase.

Appearances in the twenty-first century
The August 14, 2001 episode of CNN's Larry King Live program included a discussion about whether the sport of polo was an appropriate part of the image of the British Royal Family. Joining King on the program were "best-selling biographer and veteran royal watcher Robert Lacey" and Kitty Kelley, author of the book The Royals. Their discussions focused on Prince Charles and his son Prince William:

The term appears in the 2003 Broadway musical Wicked, where it is used by the characters Elphaba and Glinda to refer to the many inhabitants of the Emerald City: "... I wanna be in this hoi polloi ..."

The term also appears in the 2007 film Hairspray, where it is used by the character Edna saying: "You see me hobnobbing and drinking Rum and Cokes with all those hoi polloi?"

Jack Cafferty, a CNN anchorman, was caught misusing the term. On 9 December 2004 he retracted his statement, saying "And hoi-polloi refers to common people, not those rich morons that are evicting those two red-tail hawks (ph) from that fifth Avenue co-op. I misused the word hoi-polloi. And for that I humbly apologize."

New media and new inventions have also been described as being by or for the hoi polloi. Bob Garfield, co-host of NPR's On the Media program, 8 November 2005, used the phrase in reference to changing practices in the media, especially Wikipedia, "The people in the encyclopedia business, I understand, tend to sniff at the wiki process as being the product of the mere hoi polloi."

In "Sunk Costs" (season 3 episode 3) of Better Call Saul, Jimmy has been arrested and the DDA (Oakley) teases him "getting fingerprinted with the hoi polloi".

In "Hooray! Todd Episode!" (season 4 episode 3) of BoJack Horseman, Princess Carolyn (in the hopes of making a celebrity actress more relatable to the public) orders a press release to be prepared, stating "Portnoy finds joy in hoi polloi boy toy", referring to Todd as a "down-to-earth boring nobody". 

Cellar Darling uses the expression as the lyrical hook in the song The Hermit from their debut album This Is the Sound.

List of twenty-first century commercial uses
The phrase "hoi polloi" has been used to promote products and businesses. As described by the Pittsburgh Dish, the name "Hoi Polloi" may be chosen to indicate that the brand or service will appeal to the "common people".
 Hoi Polloi is the name of many businesses, including a restaurant in the United Kingdom, Hoipolloi a theatre company based in Cambridge in the United Kingdom, a dance group based in New York City, a woman's boutique in New Orleans, Louisiana, a Cafe-Bar in Agia Galini, Greece, a film crew in the United Kingdom, and a global telecommunications company.
 Oi Polloi is a Scottish anarcho-punk group, whose name is a pun on the term, and also Oi! music. Hoi Polloi was an alternative gospel band from New Zealand.
 Oi Polloi is the name of a menswear boutique founded in Manchester, with stores in Manchester and London.
 Hoi Polloi is a Marketing Communications blog by Angelo Fernando, a business writer covering technology, marketing, and interactive media.
 Hoi Polloi is the title of a literary journal produced by Dog Days Press in Massachusetts.
 Ahoi Polloi is the name of a well-known German cartoon blog.

The phrase has also been used in commercial works as the name a race of people.
 hoi polloi is used by the character Kindle in the video game Advance Wars: Dual Strike.
 Scientology founder L. Ron Hubbard claimed the existence of a race of extraterrestrial invaders known as the Hoipolloi.

See also
Dominant ideology

References

External links

English phrases
Greek words and phrases
Social classes